65 TV Themes! From the 50's and 60's is the first volume of the Television's Greatest Hits series of compilation albums by TVT Records. From the 50's and 60's was a double LP that featured 65 themes from television shows ranging from the mid-1950s until the late 1960s.

The album catalog was later acquired by The Bicycle Music Company. In September 2011, Los Angeles-based Oglio Records announced they were releasing the  Television's Greatest Hits song catalog after entering into an arrangement The Bicycle Music Company. A series of 9 initial "6-packs" including some of the songs from the album has been announced for 2011.

Don Pardo "hosted" the original LP and cassette versions from 1985. Five tracks are exclusive to the original 1985 releases... 
 The first track on the first record/tape, side one, begins with a musical sample of Edvard Grieg's "Morning Mood" from the Peer Gynt suite, which is interrupted by Don Pardo beginning the "broadcast day." 
 Side one concludes with a faux test announcement of the Emergency Broadcast System, leading into the "Duck and Cover" song (from the 1951 Civil Defense education film of the same name.)
 Side two concludes with easy-listening music and Pardo making announcements of the "station" having technical difficulties and to please stand by. This was also sampled on Hexstatic's album Rewind.
 Side three (the first side on the second record/tape) concludes with a medley of news themes and announcer voices, led off by Pardo announcing a faux news bulletin interrupting the "broadcast" over a music sample of Beethoven's 9th Symphony, specifically the "Scherzo" movement.
 Side four (and the whole album) concludes with Don Pardo signing-off the "broadcast day" with a recording of the United States national anthem (enhanced with explosion and firework sounds near the end), and then fades on a test pattern tone (signaling the "station" has gone off the air.)

Track listing 
NOTE: An asterisk (*) designates a track that was re-recorded for either a later season of the TV show, a single/album by the theme song artist or this album. A double asterisk (**) denotes a track exclusive to the record and cassette versions only, and, except for the Japanese release on CBS/Sony, do not show up on any CD version.

Side A (LP and Cassette versions)
Peer Gynt: Morning Suite** Talking Voices (performed by): Don PardoMusic Composed by Edvard Grieg
Captain Kangaroo ("Puffin' Billy")* Music Composed by Edward White
The Little Rascals ("Good Old Days") Music Composed by Roy ShieldsFirst appeared in the 1930 Our Gang/Little Rascals short "Teacher's Pet"
The Flintstones ("Meet the Flintstones") Background Vocals sung by The Skip-Jacks(Music & Lyrics) Written by Hoyt Curtin, William Hanna & Joseph Barbera
The Woody Woodpecker Show Music Composed by George Tibbles & Ramey Idriss
The Bugs Bunny Show ("The Bugs Bunny Overture (This Is It!)") Written by Jerry Livingston & Mack David
Casper the Friendly Ghost - Written by Jerry Livingston & M. David
Felix the Cat - Written by Winston SharplesVocals performed by Ann Bennett
Popeye - Written by Sammy LernerMusic Arranged by Winston Sharples
Yogi Bear - Written by H. Curtin, W. Hanna & J. Barbera
Magilla Gorilla - Written by H. Curtin, W. Hanna & J. Barbera
Top Cat Written by H. Curtin, W. Hanna, J. Barbera & Evelyn Timmens
The Jetsons ("Meet George Jetson") Written by H. Curtin, W. Hanna & J. Barbera
Fireball XL5 - Music Composed by Barry GrayLyrics Written by Charles BlackwellVocals sung by Don Spencer
Howdy Doody Lyrics Written by Buffalo Bob Smith & Edward KeanTalking Voices: Buffalo Bob SmithBackground Vocals: "A Choir of 40-Children"Music based on the vaudeville song "Ta-ra-ra Boom-de-ay", originally credited as composed by Henry J. Sayers
Test of the Emergency Broadcast System - Duck and Cover** EBS Voice: Don Pardo"Duck and Cover" Songwriting Credited to Civil Defense Department
Side B
The Beverly Hillbillies ("The Ballad of Jed Clampett")* Performed by Flatt & Scruggs featuring Jerry ScogginsWritten by Paul Henning
Petticoat Junction* - Written by P. Henning & Curt MasseyVocals sung by Curt Massey
Green Acres  - Vocals Performed by Eddie Albert & Eva GaborWritten by Vic Mizzy
Mister Ed - Vocals Performed by Jay LivingstonMusic Composed by Jay LivingstonLyrics Written by Ray Evans
The Munsters* - Music Composed by Jack Marshall
The Addams Family - Written & Arranged by Vic MizzyBackground Vocals: Vic MizzyFinger Snaps & Additional Voices: Ted Cassidy
My Three Sons* - Music Composed by Frank De Vol
The Donna Reed Show* - Music Composed by John Seely
Leave It to Beaver ("The Toy Parade")* - Music Composed by Dave Kahn, Melvyn Leonard & Mort Greene
Dennis the Menace* - Music Composed by John Seely & William Loose
The Many Loves of Dobie Gillis* - Music Composed by Lionel NewmanLyrics Written by Max ShulmanVocals performed by Judd Conlon's Rhythmaires
The Patty Duke Show Written by Robert Wells, Sid Ramin & Harry GellerVocals performed by The Skip-Jacks
The Dick Van Dyke Show* - Music Composed by Earle Hagen
Gilligan's Island ("The Ballad of Gilligan's Isle")* - Written by George Wyle & Sherwood Schwartz
McHale's Navy* - Music Composed by Axel Stordahl
I Dream of Jeannie ("Jeannie")* - Music Composed by Hugo Montenegro & Buddy Kaye
I Love Lucy* - Music Composed by Eliot Daniel & Harold Adamson
The Andy Griffith Show ("The Fishin' Hole")* Performed by Earle HagenMusic Composed by E. Hagen & Herbert W. Spencer
Please Stand By** - Voices: Don Pardo
Side C
Star Trek ("Theme from Star Trek")* - Written by Alexander CourageMonologue Voice narrated by William ShatnerSoprano Vocals sung by Loulie Jean Norman
Lost In Space* - Music Composed by Johnny T. Williams
The Twilight Zone* - Music Composed by Marius Constant 
Alfred Hitchcock Presents ("Funeral March of a Marionette")* Music Composed by Charles Gounod
Superman ("Superman March") Written & Arranged by Leon KlatzkinNarrator Voiced by Bill Kennedy
Batman* - Written by Neal HeftiContains replayed elements from "To the Batmobile", as performed by Nelson Riddle with Adam West & Burt Ward, with Dialog written by Lorenzo Semple Jr.
Flipper* - Music Composed by Henry VarsLyrics Written by William "By" Dunham
Combat! - Music Composed by Leonard Rosenman
The Rifleman* - Music Composed by Herschel Burke Gilbert
Bonanza* - Performed by Al CaiolaMusic Composed by Jay Livingston & Ray Evans
Branded - Written by Dominic Frontiere & Alan Alch
F Troop - Written by William Lava & Irving Taylor
Rin Tin Tin - Music Composed by Stanley Keyana
Daniel Boone* - Music Composed by Lionel NewmanLyrics Written by Ken DarbyLyrics Credited to Vera Matson
The Wild Wild West* - Music Composed by Richard Markowitz
The Lone Ranger (Music taken from "William Tell Overture") Music Composed by Gioachino RossiniMusic Arranged by Ben BonnellOrchestra conducted by Daniel Perez CastanedaNarrator Voices: Gerald Mohr & Fred FoySampled Voice ("Hi-Yo Silver"): Earle W. Graser
The Roy Rogers Show ("Happy Trails") Written by Dale Evans & Foy Willing
We Interrupt This Program - News Medley** Additional Voices: Don PardoFeaturing Music Composed by Ludwig van Beethoven
Side D
Mission: Impossible* - Music Composed by Lalo Schifrin
The Man from U.N.C.L.E. - Music Composed by Jerry Goldsmith
Get Smart* - Music Composed by Irving Szathmary
Secret Agent Man* - Performed by Johnny RiversWritten by P. F. Sloan & Steve Barri
Dragnet ("Theme and March")* - Performed by Ray AnthonyWritten by Walter SchumannMusic based on the "Main Title", from the 1946 film "The Killers", composed & performed by Miklós Rózsa
Perry Mason ("Park Avenue Beat")* - Music composed by Fred Steiner
Adam-12 - Written by Frank Comstock
The F.B.I. - Music Composed by Bronisław Kaper
Hawaii Five-O* - Performed by The VenturesMusic Composed by Morton Stevens
77 Sunset Strip* - Written by Jerry Livingston & Mack David
Surfside 6 - Written by Jerry Livingston & M. David
Ironside* - Music Composed by Quincy Jones
Mannix* - Music Composed by L. Schifrin
The Mod Squad - Music Composed by Earle Hagen
The Tonight Show ("Johnny's Theme")* - Music Composed by Johnny Carson & Paul Anka
The Late Show ("The Syncopated Clock")* - Music Composed by Leroy Anderson
WTV Toons Sign-Off - The Star-Spangled Banner** - Voices: Don PardoMusic Composed by Francis Scott Key

Reception
Alongside Television's Greatest Hits Volume II, the compilation was described by CD Review as "organized as a theoretical average viewing day". CD Review jokingly commented that the compilation would be "highly effective during interrogations" by the FBI.

References

External links
Television's Greatest Hits at Oglio Records

1985 compilation albums
TVT Records compilation albums
Television's Greatest Hits albums